Clap Clap may refer to:

 "Clap Clap" (Gran Error, Elvana Gjata and Antonia song), a 2022 song by Gran Error, Elvana Gjata, and Antonia
 "Clap Clap", a 2022 song by NiziU
 Clap! Clap!, the stage name of Italian musician Cristiano Crisci